R.Y.C. is the second studio album by Guernsey-born music producer Alex Crossan, under his alias Mura Masa. It was released on 17 January 2020 by Polydor Records and Anchor Point Records. The album has guest features by Clairo, Slowthai, Tirzah and Ellie Rowsell.

The first single "No Hope Generation" was released 25 October 2019.

Critical reception

R.Y.C. was met with generally favourable reviews from critics. At Metacritic, which assigns a weighted average rating out of 100 to reviews from mainstream publications, it received an average score of 65, based on 12 reviews.

Track listing

Notes
 "A Meeting at an Oak Tree" and "Vicarious Living Anthem" are stylized in all lowercase.
 "Nocturne for Strings and a Conversation" is stylized "(nocturne for strings and a conversation)"

Personnel
Musicians
 Mura Masa – vocals (1, 2, 5–7, 9, 10), bass guitar (1–5, 10, 11), bass programming (1, 2, 4, 6–10), drum programming (1, 2, 4–10), guitar (1–8, 10), synthesizer programming (1, 2, 4–10), additional vocals (3, 8), programming (3, 11); drums, synthesizer (3); piano (8, 9); spoken word, strings (11)
 Kai Campos – programming, synthesizer (1)
 Clairo – vocals (3)
 Ned Green – spoken word (4)
 Slowthai – vocals (5)
 Tirzah – vocals (8)
 Georgia – vocals (9)
 Ellie Rowsell – vocals (10)

Technical
 Mura Masa – production, engineering
 Stuart Hawkes – mastering
 Nathan Boddy – mixing

Artwork
 Mura Masa – art direction, design
 Matt de Jong – art direction, design
 Darcy Haylor – photography

Charts

References

2020 albums
Mura Masa albums
Polydor Records albums
Albums produced by Mura Masa